The discography of American rapper and record producer Sean Combs (known professionally under the pseudonyms Puffy, Puff Daddy, P. Diddy or Diddy) consists of five studio albums, one remix album and seventy-two singles – including thirty-three as a lead artist and thirty-nine as a featured artist.

Albums

Studio albums

Collaboration albums

Remix albums

Mixtapes

Singles

As lead artist

As featured artist

Other charted songs

Guest appearances

Music videos

As lead artist

Notes

References

External links
 Sean Combs at AllMusic
 
 

Discographies of American artists
Hip hop discographies
Discography